Mercedes Cabrera Calvo-Sotelo, GCIH (born 3 December 1951) is a Spanish politician, political scientist, historian, and minister. She is also niece of Leopoldo Calvo-Sotelo Bustelo, former prime minister and of former foreign minister Fernando Morán Lopez and  grandniece of the physicist Blas Cabrera Felipe.

Biography
Cabrera holds a PhD in political sciences and sociology from the Complutense University of Madrid and from 1996 onwards she was professor of history of Political Theory and of the social and political movements in the Complutense University.

She is married to Carlos Arenillas, vice-president of the Comisión Nacional del Mercado de Valores (CNMV, Spanish National Stock Exchange Commission) and has two children. She has been a Spanish Socialist Workers' Party (PSOE) deputy for the constituency of Madrid since 2004 when she ran second on the party list after Prime Minister José Luis Rodríguez Zapatero. She was chosen as chair of the Parliamentary committee on education and science in the Congress of the Deputies. She is a member of the board of governors of the Pablo Iglesias Foundation  and president of the Association of Friends of the "Residencia de Estudiantes". Also she has been a teacher at the  "Estudio" School of Madrid. On 7 April 2006 she was named Spanish minister of education and science by Prime Minister José Luis Rodríguez Zapatero, Position she held until April 2009 when she was substituted by Ángel Gabilondo.

Honours
 Grand-Cross of the Order of Prince Henry, Portugal (25 September 2006)

Published works
 The employer's association before the Second Republic. Organizations and strategy (1931–1936). Publishing Century XXI. 1983..
 The power of the industrialists. Policy and economy in contemporary Spain (1875–2000) Publishing Taurus. 2002. .
 With light and stenographers: Parliament in the Restoration (1913–1923). Taurus Editorial. 1998. .
 The industry, the press and the policy: Nicholas Maria de Urgoiti (1869–1951). Publishing Alliance. 1994. .

References

External links
 Personal file in Congress
 USC News

1951 births
People from Madrid
Living people
Complutense University of Madrid alumni
Women government ministers of Spain
Spanish Socialist Workers' Party politicians
Members of the 8th Congress of Deputies (Spain)
Members of the 9th Congress of Deputies (Spain)
Education ministers of Spain
21st-century Spanish women politicians
Historians of the Second Spanish Republic
Historians of the Bourbon Restoration in Spain